The 1989 Campeonato de España de waterpolo femenino was the second edition of RFEN's premier championship for women's water polo clubs. It took place from May 26 to June 11, 1989, and it was contested by twelve teams.   CN Catalunya won all five games in the final stage to win its first title, while defending champion CN Molins de Rei was the runner-up.

First stage
The following teams didn't qualify for the final stage:

 Alcorcón
 El Olivar
 Las Encinas de Boadilla
 La Latina
 Martiánez
 Ondarreta

Final stage

References

División de Honor Femenina de Waterpolo
Seasons in Spanish water polo competitions
Spanish Championship
Waterpolo Femenino